Fernando Fernández Sánchez (born 7 July 1990) is a Peruvian chess International Master (IM) (2017), Peruvian Chess Championship winner (2016).

Biography
In 2016, Fernando Fernández Sánchez won Peruvian Chess Championship. In 2017, in Barcelona he won International Chess Tournament XIX Obert Internacional Sant Martí.

Fernando Fernández Sánchez played for Peru in the Chess Olympiad:
 In 2016, at reserve board in the 42nd Chess Olympiad in Baku (+2, =1, -2).

In 2017, he was awarded the FIDE International Master (IM) title.

References

External links

Fernando Fernández Sánchez chess games at 365Chess.com

1990 births
Living people
Peruvian chess players
Chess International Masters
Chess Olympiad competitors
20th-century Peruvian people
21st-century Peruvian people